Ronni Le Tekrø (born Rolf Ågrim Tekrø, 5 October 1963)  is a Norwegian guitarist best known for playing with the Norwegian hard rock band TNT and as a solo guitarist cooperating with guitarists Terje Rypdal and Mads Eriksen as "N3". LeTekrø was born in Oslo but moved to Raufoss at a young age, and has lived there all his life except for the period between 1982 and 1985, when he lived in Trondheim.

Le Tekrø sound
Le Tekrø plays with an extremely accomplished technique. One of the big differences in his playing is that his guitar solos are usually a separate melody which can actually be hummed, similar to Neil Schon's solos in Journey songs. He has also the technical ability to play fast with his "machine gun technique", but he does so sparingly. Zakk Wylde is one of the more outspoken fans of Ronni.

Le Tekrø debuted on record on a self released 1981 single with the band Roquefire - The Island Of Marat / (Heavy) Boys Don't Cry. Le Tekrø has collaborated with the Norwegian guitarist and composer Terje Rypdal and has released three albums and one live album (on ECM records) featuring the fruits of that collaboration.
Le Tekrø's vocals tend to be deep, with emphasis on vibrato and falsetto.
His inspirations as a guitarist include Steve Hillage, Brian May, Jimmy Page, Brian Robertson, Jimi Hendrix, and Ted Nugent.
It is claimed that Ronni invented the "Machine Gun Style." 
George Lynch of Dokken states Le Tekrø's solo for "Caught between the Tigers" is "a real face-melter. It's spine-tingling."

He owns his own high end recording studio located in the woods of Toten, Norway called Studio Studio Nyhagen where bands like Mayhem, 1349 (band), Darkthrone, Enslaved, Chrome Division as well as TNT along with several others has recorded albums. 
Since 2010 Ronni has had a close musical relation with Ledfoot that culminated in the 2020 duo album A Death Divine

Equipment
Le Tekrø's main guitar live is the so-called "Holocaster". Originally a light pink ESP guitar from the early eighties. The head is signed by close friend Brian Robertson formerly from Thin Lizzy and Motörhead. Le Tekrø uses his black early seventies Fender Stratocaster as a back-up for live performances. On the "Atlantis" tour Tekrø uses an Epiphone 1959 or a Morgan strat on the opening song "Hello, Hello".

Also known for pioneering the use of the Quarterstepper Guitar. This guitar has twice as many frets as normal guitar, spread throughout the neck with quarter-tone intervals. This guitar was invented by Bernie Hamburger of Hamburgerguitar and Le Tekrø himself. He used the guitar for the solo in Wisdom from the Intuition album, and several others recordings. Hamburger also built a 12 string hollow body that Le Tekrø has used on various tours and recordings.

In the studio Le Tekrø uses a wide range of effects and amps.

His trademark Fender Stratocaster is notably unusually set up, with a Rockinger tremolo bridge and a Seymour Duncan pickup at the bridge position, no middle pickup, and an active custom made Magnetics™ pickup in the tail position.

Ronni is currently endorsed by ESP guitars and Marshall amplification.

For live performances Le Tekrø uses:
 OD-1 Overdrive
 BF-2 Flanger
 CE-2 Chorus
 Roland RE-150 Space Echo Tape Delay,
 Dunlop CryBaby
 Digitech Whammy II
 Marshall 2204 heads
 Marshall 1960 A cabinets

Wiccan witch
Le Tekrø has been practicing the nature religion Wicca since the 1980s, and he labels himself a witch. He even has a master's degree in Wicca witchcraft.. He claims to know how to store energies in stones out in the forest and go out and charge up his batteries from them when he needs to. He says in a Norwegian newspaper interview in 2007 that Wicca helps him deal with such matters as death and guilt and that he prefers this to "fairytales from the Middle East which have thrown an entire world into war".

partial discography

TNT

Solo and collaborated records
 Wonderland (Embee Normann) (1993)
 Dedicated to Thin Lizzy (Bad Habitz) (1993)
 Vagabond (Vagabond) (1994)
 A Huge Fan Of Life (Vagabond) (1995)
 Rypdal & Tekrø (Terje Rypdal) (RCA 74321 242962) (1997)
 Rypdal/Tekrø II (Terje Rypdal) (1997)
 Starfire (Jørn Lande) 2000- Guest on "The Day the Earth Caught Fire"
 Extra Strong String (2000)
 Magica Lanterna (2002)
 Under the Misteltoe (Evil Elf Band) (2002)
 The Radiosong (Terje Rypdal) (2002)
 Le Freak on Let's dance (Norwegian Gospel Voices) (2002)
 Camouflage (Wild Willy's Gang) (2005)
 Gods Of Thunder – A Norwegian Tribute To KISS ( Covered Detroit Rock City by Kiss along with former band-colleague Tony Harnell. ) Unlocking the Past(Jørn Lande)(2007)(guest on "The Day the Earth Caught Fire" rerecording)
 Kingdom of Norway (2007)
 Demonoir' (1349 (band)) (2010)
 Mein Ampf (2014)
 Mein Ampf II (2015)
 A Death Divine (with Ledfoot) (2020)
 Telegram (single) (The Halloween Project, The Fluffy Jackets) (2021)
 Bigfoot TV (2022)

References

Literature
 Østbø, Stein Hekta : Ronni Le Tekrø : et liv i rock, N.W. Damm & Søn AS, Oslo (September 2007),  (includes CD)

Living people
Norwegian heavy metal guitarists
TNT (Norwegian band) members
Norwegian jazz guitarists
1963 births
Norwegian record producers
Norwegian Wiccans
Musicians from Oslo
People from Vestre Toten
Musicians from Oppland
Lead guitarists
Norwegian multi-instrumentalists